Elections to Portsmouth City Council were held on 6 May 1999.  One third of the council was up for election and the Labour party stayed in overall control of the council.

After the election, the composition of the council was
Labour 20
Conservative 10
Liberal Democrat 9

Election result

References
1999 Portsmouth election result

1999
1999 English local elections
1990s in Hampshire